Gutiérrez is a Spanish surname meaning "son of Gutier / Gutierre". Gutierre is a form of Gualtierre, Spanish form of Walter. Gutiérrez is the Spanish form of the English surnames Walters, Watkins, and Watson, and has Germanic etymological origin.

The Visigoths, who ruled Spain between the mid-5th and early 8th centuries, had a profound impact on the development of surnames. This name originally derived from the baptismal name Gutierre. And the Portuguese version of this surname is Guterres.

Notable people with the surname include:

General
 Alfredo Gutiérrez (disambiguation), multiple people
 Armando Gutierrez, Cuban-American businessman, activist and political consultant
 Carlos Gutiérrez (disambiguation), multiple people
 Daniel G. P. Gutierrez Episcopal Bishop of Pennsylvania
 Diego Gutiérrez (disambiguation), multiple people
 Gustavo Gutiérrez (born 1928), Peruvian theologian, Dominican priest, founder of Liberation Theology at the University of Notre Dame
 José Ángel Gutiérrez, University of Texas at Austin lecturer
 Kris Gutiérrez, American professor
 Rochelle Gutierrez, American professor of education
 Sergio Gutíerrez Benítez, Mexican Catholic priest and retired luchador
 Sidney M. Gutierrez (born 1951), retired USAF colonel and NASA astronaut
 Sonia Gutierrez, American educator and Hispanic rights activist

Arts
 Antonio García Gutiérrez, Spanish playwright
 Ariadna Gutiérrez (born 1993), Miss Colombia 2014, 1st runner up Miss Universe 2015
 Ash Gutierrez (born 2005), American musician
 Chin Chin Gutierrez, Filipino actress and environmentalist
 Donald Gutierrez (1932–2013), American writer
 Eddie Gutierrez (actor) (Jorge Eduardo Pickett Gutierrez), Filipino actor
 Eloísa Jiménez Gutiérrez (1908–1990), Mexican artist
 Emilio Gutiérrez (born c. 1963), US-based Mexican journalist
 Grace Gutierrez (born 1989), American artist
 Horacio Gutiérrez (born August 28, 1948), Cuban-American classical pianist
 Juan Gutiérrez de Padilla (c. 1590 – 1664), Spanish-Mexican composer
 Judith Gutiérrez, Ecuadorian master Latin American painter
 Miguel Gutierrez (choreographer), American dancer
 Miguel Gutiérrez (writer) (1940–2016), Peruvian writer
 Pedro Elías Gutiérrez (1870-1954) Venezuelan musician, composer
 Pedro Juan Gutiérrez, Cuban journalist, writer and artist
 Raymond Gutierrez, Filipino TV host
 Richard Gutierrez, Filipino actor
 Ruffa Gutierrez (born 1974), Filipina actress, model, beauty queen, and Ms. World

Politicians
 Álvaro Gutiérrez (politician), Peruvian politician
 Carl T.C. Gutierrez (born 1941), Guamanian politician and governor of Guam
Daniel Gutiérrez Castorena (born 1954), Mexican politician
 Doris Gutiérrez (born 1947), Honduran lawyer and politician
 Eulalio Gutiérrez (1881–1939) provisional president of Mexico from late 1914 to early 1915
 Joaquín Gutiérrez Cano (1920–2009), Spanish diplomat and politician
 Jaime Abdul Gutiérrez (1936–2012), member of the Revolutionary Government Junta of El Salvador from 1979 to 1982
 Lino Gutierrez (born 26 March 1951) U.S. diplomat and ambassador to Argentina
 Lucio Gutiérrez, former president of Ecuador
 Luis Gutiérrez (born 1953), Democratic member of the United States House of Representatives representing Illinois's 4th congressional district
 Merceditas Gutierrez, Filipino ombudsman
 Patricia Gutiérrez (born 1983), Venezuelan politician and activist
 Rafael Antonio Gutiérrez (1845–1921), Salvadoran President from 1894 to 1898

Sports

General
 Cristina Gutiérrez (born 1991), Spanish rally raid driver
 Esteban Gutiérrez (born 1991), Mexican racing driver
 Heberth Gutiérrez (born 1973), Colombian road cyclist
 Jorge Gutiérrez (boxer), Cuban boxer
 Jorge Gutierrez (basketball) (born 1988), American
 Jorge Gutiérrez (squash player) (born 1979), Argentine squash player 
 Jose Antonio Gutierrez Castillo (born 1943), Colombian chess master
 José Enrique Gutiérrez Cataluña (born 1974), professional road racing cyclist
 Katia Gutiérrez (born 1989), Mexican boxer
 Keibel Gutiérrez (born 1987), Cuban volleyball player 
 Matt Gutierrez, American football player
 Max Gutiérrez (born 2002), Mexican racing driver
 Sergio Gutiérrez-Ferrol, tennis player
 Tonatiuh Gutiérrez (born 1929), Mexican swimmer

Baseball
 César Gutiérrez (1943–2005), Venezuelan shortstop in Major League Baseball
 Franklin Gutiérrez (born 1983), Venezuelan baseball player in Major League Baseball
 Jackie Gutiérrez (born 1960), Major League Baseball shortstop
 Kelvin Gutiérrez (born 1994), Dominican baseball player
 Ricky Gutiérrez, major league baseball player
 Vladimir Gutiérrez (born 1995), Cuban baseball player

Football (Soccer)
 Álvaro Gutiérrez (footballer) (born 1968), former Uruguayan football midfielder
 Cristián Gutiérrez (born 1997), Chilean footballer
 Eddie Gutierrez (soccer) (born 1983), American soccer player
 Felipe Gutiérrez, Chilean footballer
 Jonás Gutiérrez (born 1983), Argentine footballer
 Juanito Gutiérrez (born 1976), Spanish footballer
 Sebastián Gutiérrez (footballer) (born 1997), Colombian footballer
 Sergio Gutiérrez (footballer) (born 1989), Colombian football player
 Teófilo Gutiérrez, Colombian footballer
 Erick Gutiérrez, Mexican footballer
 Guti, Spanish footballer

Wrestling
 José Gutiérrez Hernández (born 1972) Mexican professional wrestler, better known as Último Guerrero
 Óscar Gutiérrez, also known as Rey Mysterio (born 1974), professional wrestler who works for the Raw brand of WWE
 Dominik Gutiérrez, also known as Dominik Mysterio (born 1997), professional wrestler with the Raw brand of WWE and son of the above
 Sergio Gutiérrez (born 1945), Mexican priest and professional wrestler better known as Fray Tormenta

See also
Gutiérrez (magazine), Spanish satirical magazine in Madrid

References

Spanish patronymic surnames
Spanish-language surnames
Surnames of Colombian origin
Surnames from given names